Glassonby is a civil parish in the Eden District, Cumbria, England.  It contains 19 listed buildings that are recorded in the National Heritage List for England.  Of these, two are listed at Grade II*, the middle of the three grades, and the others are at Grade II, the lowest grade.  The parish contains the villages of Glassonby, Gamblesby, and Unthank, and the surrounding countryside.  Most of the listed buildings are houses and associated structures, farmhouses and farm buildings.  The other listed buildings include churches and associated structures, a former public house, and two milestones.


Key

Buildings

References

Citations

Sources

Lists of listed buildings in Cumbria
Listed buildings